Sar Choluskan may refer to:
 Sar Choluskan-e Sofla